George Warburton (12 December 1915 – 26 October 1996) was an English professional footballer who played as a forward.

Career
Born in The Hague, Netherlands - where his father Fred was a football coach - Warburton played for Morecambe, Aston Villa, Preston North End, Chester, Netherfield and Lancaster City.

Warburton played alongside his brother Joe at Morecambe.

References

1915 births
1996 deaths
English footballers
Morecambe F.C. players
Aston Villa F.C. players
Preston North End F.C. players
Chester City F.C. players
Kendal Town F.C. players
Lancaster City F.C. players
English Football League players
Footballers from The Hague
Association football forwards